Elena Hrenova (14 January 1950 – 22 November 2020) was a Russian-Moldovan politician who from 2014 to 2019 was a Member of the Moldovan Parliament representing the Party of Socialists of the Republic of Moldova (PSRM). She was a member of the Parliamentary Committee on Social Protection, Health and the Family. Previously, between 2011 and 2015, she was a councilor in the Chisinau Municipal Council.

Biography
In the November 2014 parliamentary elections, Hrenova ran for the position of deputy on the 20th position in the PSRM list, obtaining the mandate of deputy in the Moldovan Parliament for the 20th legislature.

Until 29 November 2012, she was a member of the Party of Communists of the Republic of Moldova, when she left the Communists and joined the faction of the Party of Socialists of the Republic of Moldova in the municipal council. She resigned as a councilor in January 2015, in connection with the incompatibility of positions.

Hrenova was also the organizer and president of the public association "Equitate". Hrenova did not know Romanian (in her opinion, the Moldovan language) and spoke only Russian in parliament.

On 22 November 2020, Hrenova died of COVID-19.

References

1950 births
2020 deaths
Moldovan MPs 2014–2018
Party of Communists of the Republic of Moldova politicians
Party of Socialists of the Republic of Moldova politicians
Moldovan female MPs
21st-century Russian women politicians
Deaths from the COVID-19 pandemic in Moldova